Kutisvara or Kdei So is a small brick temple consisting of three towers in ruined condition. It is the site of Kuti, mentioned in the stele of Sdok Kok Thom in connection with the 9th century of Jayavarman II. Besides, an inscription found on a stone reused for the building of Banteay Kdei next door mentions dedication to Shiva and the erection of two statues of Vishnu and Brahma by Shivacarya, one of Rajendravarman's priests in the 10th century.

There are three collapsed brick towers arranged in a north–south row on a raised earth all facing to east. The platform of the central tower is brick but the other two are built in laterite.

Gallery

References 

Angkorian sites in Siem Reap Province